Brezovk is a small settlement in the Municipality of Brda the Littoral region of Slovenia.

References

External links
Brezovk on Geopedia

Populated places in the Municipality of Brda